Russtroybank — Russian commercial bank. Full name of the — Closed Joint Stock Company «RUSSIAN CONSTRUCTION BANK». Abbreviated name of CJSC «RUSSTROYBANK». Headquarters - in Moscow. General license for banking operations of Bank of Russia No. 3205 since September 7, 2012. License to conduct banking operations with precious metals No. 3205 since July 6, 2006.

Ratings
The Bank is ranked among the top 150 banks in Russia. According to Moody's Interfax Rating Agency, based on 2012 results, it took the 145th  place in terms of assets. According to the "RBC" agency ranking, at the end of 2012, the bank took the 120th place in terms of size of liquid assets, ranked 116th largest on its loan portfolio (91st place on loans to legal entities), on loans to individuals it ranked 159th, and 116th was its position in terms of deposit portfolio. The "Expert RA" agency assigned the bank's credit rating at A level: "high level of creditworthiness".

References

External links

Russtroybank website 

Banks of Russia
Companies based in Moscow
Banks established in 1995
1995 establishments in Russia